Carrick Davins GAA is a Gaelic Athletic Association club located in the town of Carrick-on-Suir in south County Tipperary in Ireland.  It is one of three GAA clubs in the town, one of which, St Molleran's, is in County Waterford in the southern suburb of Carrickbeg across the River Suir. The club plays both hurling and Gaelic football but is predominantly a hurling club. The club enjoys a keen rivalry with Carrick Swans GAA. The club is named in honour of Maurice Davin, the first President of the GAA, who lived near the town.

History
Carrick-on-Suir has a history of hurling and football going back to the 1800s when there were nine teams in the Carrick catchment area, consisting mainly of families and relations. Games were played in the nine acre field and there were no regulation size of pitch: usually the bounds were the ditch around a field. There were no set numbers of players, and a team could consist of up to 30 players a side.

The club was founded in 1922. In the early years there was a leaning towards the football side of the Association, and green and white jerseys borrowed from neighbours Grangemockler were worn until the 1930s when Cork red was chosen, hence the nickname The Red Rebels. In the early 1930s the club registered as The Davins in honor of the Davin brothers, founders of the GAA.

Hurling
The Davins have won 11 South Tipperary senior hurling titles, two county senior hurling titles and a Munster senior hurling club title, becoming the first Tipperary side to do so.

In 2009, Carrick Davins won the Tipperary Intermediate Hurling Championship title which saw them return to the Senior Grade. They reached a South Tipperary Senior Hurling final in 2011, where they played Mullinahone. Also in 2011, the club enjoyed a South Title in Junior hurling, which was a first in a long time.

In 2012 the club secured eight underage titles. Also in 2012 the club lost some of its hurling greats, including Club President Sean Organ.

The carrick On Suir club also won their first under 21 title in over 50 years on 25 November 2018 the young team included the likes of great up coming hurlers as Micheal whelan, Conor whelan, Ray Cooke and Conor Mackey

Honours

Munster Senior Club Hurling Championship (1)
 1966; runner-up 1967
Tipperary Senior Hurling Championship (2)
 1966, 1967; runner-up 1964
South Tipperary Senior Hurling Championship (11)
 1965, 1966, 1967, 1969, 1971, 1972, 1973, 1975, 1976, 1977, 1979
Tipperary Intermediate Hurling Championship (1)
 2009
South Tipperary Intermediate Hurling Championship (4)
 1993, 1994, 2005, 2016
Tipperary Junior Football Champiponship' (1) 1927South Tipperary Junior Football Championship (4): 1927, 1965, 1967, 1980South Tipperary Junior B Football Championship (2): 1993, 2005Tipperary Junior Hurling Championship (2): 1963, 2019South Tipperary Junior Hurling Championship (3) 1953, 1956, 1963 
 South Tipperary Junior B Hurling Championship (2) 1996, 2011South Tipperary Under-21 B Hurling Championship (5) 1964, 1965, 1966, 1967, 2018Tipperary Minor B Football Championship (2) 1985, 2002South Tipperary Minor B Football Championship (2) 1985, 2002
 South Tipperary Minor C Football Championship (1) 1999
 South Tipperary Minor Hurling Championship (9) 1933, 1934, 1935, 1936, 1947, 1951, 1964, 1966, 1984
 Tipperary Minor B Hurling Chapminonship (1) 2005
 South Tipperary Minor B Hurling Championship (3) 1997, 2002, 2005
 South Tipperary Minor C Hurling Championship''' (1) 2012

Notable players
 Mick Roche
Mikey (big wheels) Cronin
 Luke  Foran
Richie on the toe McGrath

References

External links 
Carrick Davins GAC website
Tipperary GAA website
GAAinfo page

Gaelic games clubs in County Tipperary
Hurling clubs in County Tipperary
Carrick-on-Suir